The women's cross-country competition of the cycling events at the 2015 Pan American Games was held on July 12 at the Hardwood Mountain Bike Park in Oro-Medonte.

Schedule
All times are Eastern Standard Time (UTC-3).

Results

References

Cycling at the 2015 Pan American Games
Mountain biking at the Pan American Games
Pan